Kathleen "Kathy" Miles (born January 30, 1950) is an American politician who served in both houses of the South Dakota Legislature. A Democrat, she represented District 15 in the South Dakota House of Representatives from 2003 to 2009. She then served a single term in the South Dakota Senate (2009 to 2011) before being defeated for re-election in the Democratic primary held on June 8, 2010. In that contest, Miles received 276 votes while Angie Buhl received 398.

References

External links
South Dakota Legislature - Kathy Miles official SD House website

Project Vote Smart - Representative Kathy Miles (SD) profile
Follow the Money - Kathy Miles
2008 2006 2004 2002 campaign contributions

Members of the South Dakota House of Representatives
Living people
Women state legislators in South Dakota
South Dakota state senators
1950 births
21st-century American politicians
21st-century American women politicians